The Great Dane is a large sized dog breed originating from Germany. The Great Dane descends from hunting dogs from the Middle Ages used to hunt wild boar and deer, and as guardians of German nobility. It is one of the two largest dog breeds in the world, along with the Irish Wolfhound.

History

Origins 
In the middle of the 16th century, the nobility in many countries of Europe imported strong, long-legged dogs from England, which were descended from crossbreeds between English Mastiffs and Irish Wolfhounds. They were dog hybrids in different sizes and phenotypes with no formal breed. These dogs were called Englische Docke or Englische Tocke – later written and spelled: Dogge – or Englischer Hund in Germany. The name simply meant "English dog". Since then, the English word "dog" has come to be associated with a molossoid dog in Germany and France. These dogs were bred in the courts of German nobility, independent of the English methods, since the start of the 17th century.

The dogs were used for hunting bear, boar, and deer at princely courts, with the favorites staying at night in the bedchambers of their lords. These Kammerhunde (chamber dogs) were outfitted with ornate collars, and helped protect the sleeping princes from assassins.

While hunting boar or bears, the Englische Dogge was a catch dog used after the other hunting dogs to seize the bear or boar and hold it in place until the huntsman was able to kill it. When the hunting customs changed, particularly because of the use of firearms, many of the involved dog types disappeared. The Englische Dogge became rare, and was kept only as a dog of hobby or luxury.

In Austria and Germany the Molossian hound, the Suliot dog and other imports from Greece were used in the 18th century to increase the stature of the boarhounds.

Name change 
In 1878, a committee was formed in Berlin which changed the name of the "Englische Dogge" (English mastiff derivatives) to "Deutsche Dogge" (German mastiff), this being the Great Dane. This laid the foundations from which the breed was developed. During the 19th century, the dog was known as a "German boarhound" in English-speaking countries. Some German breeders tried to introduce the names "German Dogge" and "German Mastiff" on the English market, because they believed the breed should be marketed as a dog of luxury and not as a working dog. However, due to the increasing tensions between Germany and other countries, the dog later became referred to as a "Great Dane", after the grand danois in Buffon's Histoire naturelle, générale et particulière in 1755.

Description 

The Great Dane is a large domestic dog of mastiff-sighthound type known for its big size. It is often dubbed the "Apollo of dogs". 

As described by the American Kennel Club:

The Great Dane combines, in its regal appearance, strength, and elegance with great size and a powerful, well-formed, smoothly muscled body. It is one of the giant working breeds, but is unique in that its general conformation must be so well balanced that it never appears clumsy, and shall move with a long reach and powerful drive. The Great Dane is a short-haired breed with a strong, galloping figure. In the ratio between length and height, the Great Dane should be square. Danes under minimum height are disqualified. From year to year, the tallest living dog is typically a Great Dane.

Unusually, the American Kennel Club dropped the minimum weight requirement from its standard. The male should appear more massive throughout than the female, with a larger frame and heavier bone.

Great Danes have naturally floppy, triangular ears. In the past, when Great Danes were commonly used to hunt boars, cropping of the ears was performed to make injuries to the dogs' ears less likely during hunts. Now that Danes are primarily companion animals, cropping is sometimes still done for traditional and cosmetic reasons. In the 1930s when Great Danes had their ears cropped, after the surgery, two devices called Easter bonnets were fitted to their ears to make them stand up. Today, the practice is common in the United States, but much less common in Europe. In some European countries such as the United Kingdom, Ireland, Denmark, and Germany, and parts of Australia and New Zealand, the practice is banned or controlled to only be performed by veterinary surgeons.

Coat 

According to the breed-standard, Great Danes have five to six (depending on the standard) show-acceptable coat colours:
 Fawn and brindle
Fawn: The colour is yellow-gold with a black mask. Black should appear on the eye rims and eyebrows and may appear on the ears.
Brindle: The colour is fawn and black in a chevron striped pattern. Often, they are also referred to as having a striped pattern.
 Black, harlequin and mantle
Black: The colour is a glossy black. White markings on the chest and toes are not desirable and considered faults.
Harlequin: The base colour is pure white with black torn patches irregularly and well distributed over the entire body; a pure white neck is preferred. The black patches should never be large enough to give the appearance of a blanket, nor so small as to give a stippled or dappled effect. Eligible, but less desirable, are a few small patches of grey that is consistent with a merle marking, or a white base with single black hairs showing through, which tend to give a salt and pepper or dirty effect. Merlequin (see below), a white coat with grey patches instead of black, is a disqualification.
Grey merle (Grautiger) Great Danes are acceptable in conformation shows under the FCI.  This color was previously a disqualifying fault, but the fault was deleted in a new breed standard in 2012 to provide a wider gene pool and because the grey merle gene can produce a correct harlequin coat. Their status is that they are "neither desirable nor to be disqualified". Consequently, this colour must never obtain the highest grading at dog shows.
Mantle (in some countries referred to as Boston due to the similar colouration and pattern as a Boston Terrier): The colour is black and white with a solid black blanket extending over the body; black skull with white muzzle; white blaze is optional; whole white collar preferred; a white chest; white on part or whole of forelegs and hind legs; white tipped black tail. A small white marking in the black blanket is acceptable, as is a break in the white collar.
Blue: The colour is a pure steel blue. White markings at the chest and feet permitted. Never with a fawn nuance or blackish-blue colour.

Other colours occur occasionally, but are not acceptable for conformation showing and they are not pursued by breeders who intend to breed show dogs. These colours include white, piebald, chocolate, smoky fawn or buckskin, reverse brindle or onyx, blue fawn, blue brindle, blue harlequin or porcelain, mantled fawn, mantled brindle, mantled blue, various merles (fawn merle, brindle merle, blue merle, mantled merle, chocolate merle, silver merle or platinum merle and tri-coloured merle), fawnequin, brindlequin and merlequin. The white Great Dane colour is typically associated with vision and hearing impairment.

Temperament 
The Great Dane's large and imposing appearance belies its friendly nature that can make it a loving, devoted addition to any home. With proper supervision, they are known for seeking physical affection from their owners. The breed is often referred to as a "gentle giant".

Great Danes are generally well disposed toward other dogs, other non-canine pets, and familiar humans. They generally do not exhibit extreme aggressiveness or a high prey drive. With the proper care and training, they are great around children, especially when raised with them. However, if not properly socialized, a Great Dane may become fearful or aggressive towards new stimuli (such as strangers and new environments).

Health 
Great Danes, like most giant dogs, have a faster metabolism. This results in more energy and food consumption per pound of dog than in small breeds. They have some health problems that are common to large breeds, including bloat (gastric dilatation volvulus).

Nutrition plays a role in this breed's health. Bloat, or gastric dilatation-volvulus (GDV), is the greatest killer of Great Danes. To avoid bloat, a rest period of 40 minutes to one hour after meals is recommended before exercise. Their average lifespan is 8 to 10 years; however, some Great Danes have been known to reach 12 years of age or more. Like many larger breeds, Great Danes are at particular risk for hip dysplasia.

Dilated cardiomyopathy  and many congenital heart diseases are also commonly found in the Great Dane, leading to its nickname: the heartbreak breed, in conjunction with its shorter lifespan. Great Danes also may carry the merle gene, which is part of the genetic makeup that creates the harlequin coloring. The merle gene is an incomplete dominant, meaning only one copy of the gene is needed to show the merle coloring; two merle genes produce excessive white markings and many health issues such as deafness, blindness, or other debilitating ocular issues. Great Danes can also develop wobbler disease, a condition affecting the vertebral column. Since these dogs do grow at a rapid rate, the bones in their vertebrae can push up against the spinal cord and cause weakness in the legs. This can be treated with surgery or may heal itself over time.

Cultural significance 

Animation
 Animation designer Iwao Takamoto based the character Scooby-Doo on a Great Dane. He derived his design from sketches given to him by a Hanna-Barbera employee who bred Danes, and then endeavoured to make Scooby the opposite of a perfect pedigree, with a longer tail, bowed legs, small chin and a sloping back.

Crime
 On 24 October 1975, Rinka, a Great Dane belonging to Norman Scott, was shot in a bungled attempt to murder Scott, in what became known as the Thorpe affair. In 1996, Scott Freeman and Barrie Penrose published Rinkagate: Rise and Fall of Jeremy Thorpe.

Mascots
 The Great Dane was named the state dog of Pennsylvania in 1965 and the University of Iowa had Great Danes, Rex I and Rex II, as mascots before the Hawkeye was chosen.
 "Great Danes" is the nickname of the University at Albany.  Their mascot is the Great Dane.

Military
 Just Nuisance was the only dog to be officially enlisted in the Royal Navy. Done mainly as a morale booster for World War II enlisted troops, Nuisance proved to be a lasting legacy of the small Cape Town suburb of Simon's Town.

Philosophy
 An unnamed Great Dane knocks Jean-Jacques Rousseau to the ground in Reveries of a Solitary Walker; he describes the singular feeling of peace and suspended identity that the shock of the collision brings about in him.

See also 

 Dogs portal
 List of dog breeds
 Reichshund, term used in Germany for Bismarck's Great Danes and, for a while, the entire breed

References

External links 

 Giant George is the World's Biggest Dog
 The Great Dane Dog historical marker in Savannah, Georgia

Dog breeds originating in Germany
FCI breeds
Mastiffs